The 2008 Wisconsin Badgers football team represented the University of Wisconsin–Madison during the 2008 NCAA Division I FBS football season.  The Badgers were coached by Bret Bielema and played their home games at Camp Randall Stadium in Madison, Wisconsin.

Previous season
The 2007 Wisconsin Badgers football team was not expected to win the Big 10, but with a close loss to Michigan and a 38-7 blowout loss to Penn State, expectations were much lower. However, they finished with only one more loss to Big 10 champ Ohio State and managed to get an Outback Bowl bid, only to lose 21-17 to the Tennessee Volunteers, who lost the previous Outback Bowl 20-10 to the Nittany Lions.

Schedule

Game summaries

Akron

Marshall

Fresno State

Michigan

Ohio State

Penn State

Iowa

Illinois

Michigan State

Indiana

Minnesota

Cal Poly

Rankings

Roster

Statistics

Offense

Passing

Rushing

Receiving

Season Summary 
Wisconsin once again got off to a fast start at 3-0. However, a horrible loss to Michigan and awful games against Ohio State, Penn State, and Iowa derailed the Badgers and sent them plunging down to 3-4 overall. An upset over ranked Illinois at home evened Wisconsin's record at 4-4, but an awful loss to Michigan State followed and the Badgers fell to 1-5 in the Big Ten almost before they could blink. Wisconsin won the remainder of its conference slate against Indiana and Minnesota, but the Badgers followed that up with a decidedly below average effort and wild win over Cal Poly the next week. At the end of the season, Wisconsin was destroyed 42-13 in the 2008 Champs Sports Bowl by Florida State.

Overall, this was the worst Wisconsin team since the 2001 Badgers, who missed the postseason entirely after a 5-7 season. The failure of the team to live up to lofty expectations (Wisconsin was ranked 8th in the nation before a terrible loss to Michigan) fueled fan discontent, and Bret Bielema would need a much, much better 2009 season; he could not afford to coast on goodwill from his 2006 and 2007 teams.

Regular starters

Team players selected in the 2009 NFL Draft

References

Wisconsin
Wisconsin Badgers football seasons
Wisconsin Badgers football